Bewa is a village in Jamtara district of Jharkhand state of India.

References

Villages in Jamtara district